Ayder is a yayla in Rize Province, Turkey.

Etymology
Ayder is the Hemshin word for "fields."

Geography 

It is a part of Çamlıhemşin district of Rize Province.

As a resort 

Although well known locally, the first mention of Ayder in official papers was in 1871 when the hot springs in Ayder were noted. The temperature of the water is 550C (1310F). However, the most attractive feature of Ayder is its dense forestry and a number of waterfalls nearby. In 1987 the location was declared a tourist center by the government. 
Ayder is famous for its rhododendron honey, which is produced in beehives hung on trees. It is also famous for its trout, which is farmed in abundance between Ayder and Çamlıhemşin.

References
 

Yaylas in Turkey
Tourist attractions in Rize Province
Landforms of Rize Province